The Korea Institute for International Economic Policy (KIEP), established in 1989, is a government-funded economic research institute addressing the international economy and its relationship with Korea. KIEP has aimed to be a regional hub for international economic policy research and has served as a warehouse of information on Korea's international economic policies for nearly 30 years.

As a government-funded research institute, KIEP has accomplished critical research and in-depth analysis on international economic policy issues, including international macroeconomics, finance, trade and commerce, international investment, international financial cooperation, and regional studies for a variety of governmental agencies and research partners.

As an agent of KIEP in the United States, the Korea Economic Institute of America is registered under the Foreign Agents Registration Act.

History

AUG 1989 KIEP (Korea Institute for International Economic Policy) Foundation established.
DEG 1989 Special Act for Foundation of KIEP announced; Korea Institute for International Economic Policy officially founded. (KIEP Foundation disbanded.)
JAN 1990 Supervisory responsibility over US KEI transferred to KIEP, and KOPEC Secretariat relocated to KIEP.
JAN 1992 Establishment of the Northern Regional Center. (Int’l Private Economic Council of Korea disbanded.)
OCT 1992 Northern Regional Center renamed as Center for Regional Information.
JAN 1994 Designated as the secretariat for Korea's Official Pool of International Economists.
DEC 1994 Designated as the Korea APEC Study Center. (International Economy Coordinating Committee.)
MAR 1995 KIEP Beijing Office established.
JAN 1997 Establishment of Center for Northeast Asia Research and Development (CNARD).
OCT 1997 Center for Regional Information becomes part of KIEP.
JAN 1999 The Act for the establishment of KIEP changed. (KIEP Act → Act for establishment, operation, and development of government-funded research institutions.)
APR 2000 Regional Information Center abolished, and Center for Regional Economic Studies & Research established.
MAR 2002 Establishment of the DDA Research Center.
APR 2003 Center for Northeast Asia Research Development abolished, and Center for Northeast Asian Cooperation established.
DEC 2005 Establishment of the SNU-KIEP EU Center.
JUN 2008 Center for Northeast Asian Cooperation abolished, and Center for International Development Cooperation established.
FEB 2010 China Regional and Provincial Research Group launched.
MAR 2011 Responsibility for KOPEC Secretariat services transferred to KIEP. (The incorporated association of the KOPEC disbanded and absorbed into KIEP.)
AUG 2011 Center for Regional Economic Studies & Research abolished, and Center for Emerging Economies Research established.
FEB 2012 Designated as a specialized research institution for international events by the instructions of the Ministry of Strategy and Finance. (Regulation on international event invitation and hosting.)
MAR 2012 Korea-China FTA Research Support Group launched.
APR 2013 East Asia FTA (EAFTA) Research Support Group launched.
JAN 2014 G20 Research Support Group launched.
MAY 2014 Establishment of the KU-KIEP EU Center.
JUN 2015 Establishment of the Department of Northeast Asian Economies, and the Strategy Research Team.
MAY 2017 KIEP awarded as a leading research institute in 2016.
APR 2018 Center for Area Studies established. (Chinese Economy Dept, Advanced Economies Dept, New Southern Policy Dept, New Northern Policy Dept expanded and reorganized.)
JULY 2020 Center for International Development Cooperation established.

Organization
International Macroeconomics & Finance Dept. analyzes current issues in international macroeconomics and finance, changes in the global economy, foreign ex-change and capital markets, and regional cooperation in foreign exchange/finance and reforms in international financial regimes.
International Trade Dept. studies Korean government policies in trade and commerce, analysis of the international trade regime at multinational level (e.g. WTO, APEC, OECD, G20), strategies for promotion of regional trade agreements and assessment of their economic impacts, and new issues in trade and investment (e.g. digital trade, 4th industrial revolution).
[Center for Area Studies]
Chinese Economy Dept. under Center for Area Studies analyzes Chinese economy.
Advanced Economies Dept. under Center for Area Studies analyzes advanced regional economies in America, the EU and Japan and economic cooperation with East Asian nations.
New Southern Policy Dept. under Center for Area Studies analyzes regional studies on the economies of SE Asia, Oceania and India/South Asia to support Korea's New Southern Policy, trends and policies of major countries in the area of international development cooperation and Korea's ODA policies and plans to promote cooperation with emerging economies using soft power.
New Northern Policy Dept. under Center for Area Studies analyzes regional studies on the economies of Russia/Eurasia to support Korea's New Northern Policy, international economic relations of North Korea, international cooperation for regime change in North Korea and Korean Unification, and emerging regions including Africa and Middle East.
[Center for International Development Cooperation]
Center for International Development Cooperation studies trends and policies of major countries in the area of international development cooperation and Korea's ODA policies.

References

Political and economic think tanks based in South Korea
Think tanks based in South Korea